Coffin Bay, originally Coffin's Bay, is a town at the southern extremity of the Eyre Peninsula, a wheat growing area of South Australia. At the 2016 census, Coffin Bay had a population of 611.

The town is situated on the western side of the southern tip of Eyre Peninsula about 46 km from Port Lincoln. The population swells during holiday seasons to more than 4,000 people due to its proximity to the Coffin Bay National Park.

It is a popular location for boating, sailing, swimming, water-skiing, skindiving and wind-surfing, as well as fishing (rock, surf, angling and boat).

The town is named after the bay formed by the Coffin Bay Peninsula and the mainland, and lies on the southeastern shore of the bay. Oyster farming is conducted in the quiet waters of Coffin Bay.

Coffin Bay is in the District Council of Lower Eyre Peninsula local government area, the state electoral district of Flinders and the federal Division of Grey.

History 

British naval explorer Matthew Flinders named the bay on 16 February 1802 in honour of his friend Sir Isaac Coffin, who was Resident Naval Commissioner at Sheerness, where the HMS Investigator was fitted out. The same year, French explorer Nicolas Baudin provided the alternative French name of Baie Delambre.

The bay remained uncharted until explored in March 1839 by Captain Frederick R. Lees (d.1839) in command of the brig Nereus. Lees' thorough charts became a standard reference for mariners through until the electronic era.

In November 1952 and again in October 1955, the state government surveyed a "shack area" on crown land from which allotments were available for leasing. In 1957, the private town of Coffin Bay was laid out by Stanley Germain Morgan on section 132 of the cadastral unit of the Hundred of Lake Wangary.

It was closed in 1989, with the track removed in 2001.

On 16 October 2003, boundaries were created for the locality includes the full extent of the Coffin Bay Peninsula and land to the east bounded in the north in part by the channel connecting to Kellidie Bay and by the Coffin Bay Road, and in the east by the eastern boundary of the Hundred of Lake Wangary.  The locality which was given the "long established name" includes the private town, the Coffin Bay Shack Site and the Coffin Bay National Park.

The Nauo people occupied the area prior to European settlement in the 1830s.

The historic former Coffin Bay Whaling Site at Point Sir Isaac lies within the locality and is listed on the South Australian Heritage Register.

Population
In the 2016 Census, there were 611 people in Coffin Bay. 81.0% of people were born in Australia and 93.8% of people spoke only English at home. The most common response for religion was No Religion at 44.3%.

See also 
 Coffin Bay National Park
 Kellidie Bay Conservation Park
Mount Dutton Bay Conservation Park

References

External links
Coffin Bay – SMH Travel
Coffin Bay Tourism Association
CoffinBay.net

Coastal towns in South Australia
Eyre Peninsula
Bays of South Australia